Manatí is a Colombian municipality located to the south of the Atlántico department, approximately 44 miles from Barranquilla. It was created in 1639 in a place the natives used to call Mahabana. Its current population according to the latest DANE's (Colombian National Administrative Department of Statistics) census is 13.456 people.

References

External links
 Manatí official website
 Manatí website
 Gobernacion del Atlantico - Manatí

Municipalities of Atlántico Department